Besch may refer to:

 Perl, Saarland
 Mount Besch

Surname
 Anthony Besch (1924–2002),  English opera and theatre director
 Bibi Besch (1942–1996),  Austrian-born American actress
 François Besch (born 1963)
 Nicolas Besch (born 1984), French ice hockey defenceman